Loam is a type of soil.

Loam or LOAM may also refer to:

 LOAM, the Louisiana Midland Railroad
 Loam (restaurant), a wine bar in Galway, Ireland
 Michael Loam (1797–1871), British engineer
 The Earl of Loam, a fictional character from The Admirable Crichton

See also
 Low-power AM, see Low-power broadcasting
 Loaming